Virginia Luque (born Violeta Mabel Domínguez; 4 October 1927 – 3 June 2014) was an Argentine tango singer and film actress. She made nearly 20 appearances in tango films of Argentina between 1943 and 1976.

Born in Buenos Aires, she began her career in film in 1943 in La guerra la gano yo, later appearing in Arriba el Telón o el Patio de la Morocha (1951). She starred alongside Arturo de Córdova in La Balandra Isabel llegó esta tarde, a 1949 Venezuelan–Argentine film directed by Carlos Hugo Christensen, which entered into the 1951 Cannes Film Festival.

Death
Virginia Luque died on 3 June 2014 from natural causes in her native Buenos Aires, aged 86.

Selected filmography
 Back in the Seventies (1945)
 The Yacht Isabel Arrived This Afternoon (1949)
 Arriba el Telón o el Patio de la Morocha (1951)
 Del cuplé al tango (1958)

References

External links

 

1927 births
2014 deaths
20th-century Argentine women singers
Argentine film actresses
Singers from Buenos Aires
Tango singers
Burials at La Chacarita Cemetery